von Krogh is a surname. Notable people with the surname include:

Adam Gottlob von Krogh (1768–1839), Norwegian-Danish military officer
Charlotte Christiane von Krogh (1827–1913), Danish painter
Georg von Krogh (born 1963), Norwegian academic
Gerhard Christoph von Krogh (1785–1860), Danish noble and military officer
Morten von Krogh (born 1948), Norwegian fencer